Radu-Anton Câmpeanu (28 February 1922 – 19 October 2016) was a Romanian politician who was also jurist and economist by profession, after graduating from the University of Bucharest in November 1945. During the interwar period and up until 1945, he was the leader of the National Liberal students' association at nationwide level (the equivalent of today's National Liberal Youth Wing).

While in exile in France, at some point in time due to the exile of Paul Goma and his arrival in France, Câmpeanu was suspected to have become an informer for the Securitate (the dreadful Romanian communist secret police), but no conclusive evidence has been produced to support this allegation.

Câmpeanu was the first president of the contemporary National Liberal Party (PNL) between 1990 and 1993, a political party he helped re-found in early January 1990, shortly after the fall of Communism, as well as a Senator on behalf of the PNL between 1990 and 1992, and then once more between 2004 and 2008.

During the early 1990s, Câmpeanu served as one of the 5 vice-presidents of the Provisional National Unity Council, also known as CPUN for short, a position which could be equated with that of state vice-president.

Early political career and incarceration in Communist Romania 

Radu Câmpeanu was the leader of the National Liberal students' league at nationwide level before World War II. On 8 November 1945, several months after the end of World War II, Câmpeanu participated in the first street protest of the civil society (encompassing both students and workers) which were organised in Bucharest against the forcefully-established communist regime by the Soviets in Romania. According to Câmpeanu himself, there were between 1,200 and 1,500 students who participated in that protest on 8 November 1945.

Two years later, in 1947, he was incarcerated by the Securitate (as many other non-Communist politicians from the historical PNL and PNȚ) and sent to forced labour for 15 years in the construction of the Danube–Black Sea Canal. Câmpeanu was freed in 1956, 6 years ahead of the planned authoritarian sentence, as part of the de-Stalinization process which the Romanian People's Republic undertook during the late 1950s (in essence, a policy of distancing itself from Moscow's control, thereby breaking free from the USSR satellite status).

Life in exile in France 

On 30 July 1973, with financial help on behalf of his family from abroad (more specifically, from Switzerland and France), Câmpeanu (at that time aged 55) managed to leave communist Romania for Paris, France alongside his first wife, Monica Papadopol, and their son, Barbu. The three were ransomed in exchange for approximately 10,000 USD.

Câmpeanu remained very active amongst Romanian exiles in Western Europe up until 1990, when he returned to his home country in the wake of the Romanian Revolution of 1989. While he was away in exile in France, he would lead such anti-communist and anti-totalitarian organisations as the Community of Romanians in France, the National Romanian Council, and the Union of Free Romanians. He was subsequently awarded French citizenship upon personal request, three years after his initial arrival in France, while not forfeiting his native Romanian one in the process. This later allowed him to be a member of the Union for French Democracy (UDF), a center-right and liberal political party which was presided by former French President Valéry Giscard d'Estaing.

On the occasion of an interview given in March 2010 for the Romanian documentary project "Capete Înfierbântate 13-15 iunie 1990", Câmpeanu stated that he was invited at party meetings and political debates in the Parliament of France by the Union for French Democracy as an ordinary member. Furthermore, he also stated that he was subsequently invited at political debates in the House of Commons in London, United Kingdom, thereby enjoying the overall civilised atmosphere from there.

Return to post-1989 Romania and late political career
Câmpeanu returned to Romania in early January 1990, right after the Romanian Revolution of December 1989.

Câmpeanu ran against Ion Iliescu in the 1990 Romanian presidential election, on behalf of the PNL while being at the same time endorsed by the UDMR and PER. He finished second with 10.64%, or 1,529,188 votes. Subsequently, he retained the honorific title of "1990 Founding President" of the party and was a member in the Central Political Bureau of the PNL up until his death in October 2016.

In the early 1990s, he was the vice-president of the Provisional National Unity Council in the Parliament of Romania as well as the vice-president of the Senate between 1990 and 1992. Also, during his term as PNL president, the National Liberal Party acceded to governance in the relatively technocratic national union government led by Theodor Stolojan between 1991 and 1992.

After 1993, when he lost the presidency of the PNL to his older colleague Mircea Ionescu-Quintus, Câmpeanu left the party along with a group of followers to establish a splinter political party called PNL-C which, after 10 years, would be re-integrated within the main PNL.

Additionally, in 1991, Câmpeanu withdrew the PNL from the Romanian Democratic Convention mainly because of the CDR's integration of the UDMR and the lack of will on behalf of Câmpeanu to run on common lists along with the Hungarian minority's ethnic party for the Parliament of Romania, as later stated by Câmpeanu himself in an edition of the Milionarii de la miezul nopții (Midnight millionaires; the predecessor of Marius Tucă Show) at some point during the late 1990s. Other splinter PNL groups which decided to remain within the CDR were PNL-AT and PL '93.

Subsequently, Câmpeanu ran for a second time for President on 3 November 1996, when he was supported by PNL-C and the Green Alternative Ecologists' Party under the official platform National Liberal-Ecologist Alliance. He failed to gain enough votes to enter a second round and obtained a very feeble total amount of 0.3% of all ballots cast in the first round, ranking 12th. At some point in the 1990s, Câmpeanu also proposed a possible candidacy of King Michael I for president, which was met with harsh criticism on behalf of both his fellow party colleagues and a vast amount of the electorate and civil society.

As leader of PNL-C between 1995 and 2003
From 1995 up until 2003, Radu Câmpeanu was the leader of a splinter liberal party issued from the main PNL which was called National Liberal Party-Câmpeanu. Throughout the 1990s, PNL-C refused to be (re)integrated within the main PNL and partake in the CDR-led governance from 1996 to 2000. However, it did contest the 1996 general and local elections where it scored very modest results. More specifically, PNL-C won only 15 mayor seats in 1996 and failed to gain any parliamentary presence as the National Liberal Ecologist Alliance with a feeble 0.79% at the Chamber of Deputies and 0.70% at the Senate.

At the 2000 general election, PNL-C scored better than it did in 1996, ranking 9th with 1.22% at the Senate and 1.40% at the Chamber. Nonetheless, these results were still very poor and the party did not manage to gain parliamentary presence. In 2003, PNL-C merged with the main PNL and Câmpeanu was elected senator in the 2004–2008 legislature in the Romanian Parliament on behalf of the Justice and Truth Alliance (DA).

Post-2008 involvement within the PNL
After 2008, Radu Câmpeanu did not run for another term as senator but gained the position of honorary founding president of the PNL until his death in 2016. In 2012, while talking about the 2014 presidential election, Câmpeanu stated that he did not think that "Romanians will vote for Crin Antonescu" (in the hypothesis that the latter would have been the designated candidate of the party back then again), a statement which outraged then incumbent PNL leader. Furthermore, as stated by him back then, he had correctly affirmed that the Social Liberal Union (USL) will survive only as long as the peril of Băsescu's power will linger on.

Family
Radu Câmpeanu was the son of former Dâmbovița County PNL prefect Dumitru Câmpeanu. Radu Câmpeanu is survived by one son, Barbu Câmpeanu, who is a university professor in France at École Polytechnique in Palaiseau, a southern suburb of Paris.

Publications
In 1995, Câmpeanu published a book entitled "Cu gândul la țară" (Thinking of the country), after the electoral slogan with which he ran for president back in 1990. The book was edited and published by Canadian Broadcasting Corporation (CBC) and has a total length of 144 pages.

Honours
 : 
 National Order of Faithful Service, Rank of Knight (5 December 2002)

Electoral history

Presidential elections

References

External links
  Radu Anton Câmpeanu Sinteza activității parlamentare în legislatura 2004-2008
  Radu Anton Câmpeanu

1922 births
2016 deaths
People from Dâmbovița County
University of Bucharest alumni
Romanian anti-communists
Romanian dissidents
Romanian prisoners and detainees
Prisoners and detainees of Romania
Inmates of the Danube–Black Sea Canal
Romanian emigrants to France
Chairpersons of the National Liberal Party (Romania)
Members of the Senate of Romania
Burials at Bellu Cemetery